Marcus Antonio Robinson (born February 27, 1975) is an American former football player in the NFL, who played the position of wide receiver.

He has played for the Chicago Bears, the Baltimore Ravens, and the Minnesota Vikings, as well as the Rhein Fire. He founded the Marcus Robinson Foundation for underprivileged children.

Early life
Robinson was born in Fort Valley, Georgia and attended Peach County High School in Fort Valley, where he starred in football and track. In football, he won All-America and All-State honors as a wide receiver, free safety, and punter. In track, he won regional titles on the 100 and 200 meter dashes.

College career
Robinson played wide receiver at the University of South Carolina.

Professional career

Robinson was drafted by the Chicago Bears in the 4th round (108th overall) of the 1997 NFL Draft. He missed his rookie season with a thumb injury.  In 1998, Robinson played with the Rhein Fire of NFL Europe during the NFL the offseason. He led the NFL Europe league in receiving yards, won the season MVP award, and won the championship at World Bowl '98.
 
Robinson had a successful season in 1999 with the Bears, setting a team record with 1,400 receiving yards which stood until the record was broken by Brandon Marshall in 2012.
Injuries forced him into a journeyman role for the rest of his career.

As a Baltimore Raven in 2003, Robinson caught four touchdown passes in an overtime win over the Seattle Seahawks. He was expected to be resigned, but the Ravens wanted their first star at wide receiver, so Robinson was let a free agent. He was the leading wide receiver for the Minnesota Vikings the previous three years before he was  cut on Christmas Eve, 2006. The  move came a day after the St. Paul Pioneer Press published an interview with Robinson in which he expressed displeasure with the Vikings' 6-9-1 record.

He signed a one-day contract with the Chicago Bears in June 2008, citing his desire to retire with the team that gave him his first chance in pro football. He officially retired on June 9, 2008.

Life after the NFL
Robinson is currently working as a physical trainer for young athletes. He is also the sprint coach for the Marian Hurricanes track team in Woodstock, Illinois.

Personal life
His nephew, Demarcus Robinson, is a wide receiver in the NFL and was selected in the fourth round of the 2016 NFL Draft by the Kansas City Chiefs.

Career stats

See also
 List of Chicago Bears players

References

External links 
 
 SI.com: Marcus RobinsonWR#87
 Pro-Football-Reference.Com: Marcus Robinson
 Star Tribune: Vikings: Robinson gets Christmas pink slip

1975 births
Living people
People from Fort Valley, Georgia
Players of American football from Chicago
American football wide receivers
South Carolina Gamecocks football players
Rhein Fire players
Chicago Bears players
Minnesota Vikings players
Baltimore Ravens players
Detroit Lions players
Brian Piccolo Award winners